Ödön Rádl (March 30, 1856 - December 20, 1916) was a Hungarian writer and lawyer.

He was born in Alsólugos (today Lugașu de Jos, Romania). He studied laws in Nagyvárad (today Oradea, Romania). He was a close friend of Kálmán and István Tisza. He wrote for several publications (Nagyváradi Lapok, Tiszavidék) and was a member of the Liberal Party and  Petőfi Társaság. Endre Ady criticized his conservatism.

Works
Levelek egy német faluból (1870) 
Szomorú történetek (1871)
Jean Paul (1872) 
Egy tél Olaszhonban (1872)

References

1848 births
1916 deaths
People from Bihor County
Hungarian jurists
Hungarian journalists
Hungarian writers
Liberal Party (Hungary) politicians